Boris Arias (born 9 November 1993) is a Bolivian tennis player.

Arias has a career high ATP singles ranking of 1065 achieved on 16 July 2012. He also has a career high ATP doubles ranking of 288 achieved on 19 March 2018. Arias has won six ITF Futures doubles titles.

Arias has represented Bolivia at the Davis Cup, where he has a W/L record of 4–1.

External links
 
 
 
 Boris Arias at Louisiana State University

1993 births
Living people
Bolivian male tennis players
Sportspeople from La Paz
LSU Tigers tennis players
Tennis players at the 2019 Pan American Games
Pan American Games competitors for Bolivia